Castlegar is a village and Roman Catholic parish in County Galway, Ireland, located just outside the city of Galway. It extends from Lough Corrib across to Merlin Park by the old Galway-Dublin road.
The annual Galway Races are held at Ballybrit Racecourse in the area.

Irish language
As of 2006, the electoral division of Castlegar (Castlegar ED) had a population of approximately 1,000 people, of whom 11% were Irish speakers.

History
The name Castlegar is derived from the Irish words Caisleán Gearr, which means "Short Castle".
The small Castlegar Castle, in the middle of the parish, was a guest or "short stay" castle for the Blake family's Menlo Castle.

Emigrants from Ireland went to British Columbia and named a place there after it: Castlegar, British Columbia.

Castles

 Ballybrit Castle
 Ballindooley Castle (Ballindooly)
 Castlegar Castle (Castle Gar)
 Cloonacauneen Castle (Cluanacauneen)
 Killeen Castle (Killeen)
 Menlo Castle (Menlough)
 Merlin Park Castle (formerly Doughiska/Doughiskey)

Villages and townlands
 Ballybrit
 Ballindooley
 Ballintemple
 Briarhill
 Bruckey
 Cappanabornia
 Carrabrowne
 Castlegar Village
 Coolough
 Killeen
 Killtulla
 Kyloughter
 Menlo
 Two-Mile-Ditch

Notable people
 The Blake baronets from 1622 through 1910
 Castlegar is home to the hurling family, the Connolly brothers, John and Joe Connolly.

References

Notes

Sources
 Ó Laoi, Padraic. History of Castlegar Parish. 1996

External links

Castlegar Galway
 List of Castles in Castlegar, Galway

Civil parishes of County Galway